Palau-sator is a village in the province of Girona and autonomous community of Catalonia, Spain.

The GR 92 long distance footpath, which roughly follows the length of the Mediterranean coast of Spain, passes through the village. Palau-sator lies on an inland stage of the path, between Torroella de Montgrí and Begur. To the north, towards Torroella, the path passes through Fontanilles, and to the south it passes through Pals.

References

External links
 Government data pages 

Municipalities in Baix Empordà
Populated places in Baix Empordà